Serak Gulo (Jawi: سراق ڬولو) is an annual festival celebrated by ethnic Indian Indonesian to express gratitude in Padang, West Sumatra, Indonesia. This tradition is held by distributing sugar to the public by menyerak (scattering or throwing) to it. Serak Gulo is commemorates every 1st Jumada al-Thani—in Islamic calendar.

See also

List of festivals in Indonesia
Indian Indonesians

References

Islamic festivals
Festivals in Indonesia